Noël Coypel (25 December 1628 – 24 December 1707) was a French painter, and was also called Coypel le Poussin, because he was heavily influenced by Poussin.

Coypel was born in Paris, the son of an unsuccessful artist.  Having been employed by Charles Errard to paint some of the pictures required for the Louvre, and having afterwards gained considerable fame by other pictures produced at the command of the king, in 1672 he was appointed director of the French Academy at Rome. After four years he returned to France; and not long after he became director of the Academy of Painting. The Martyrdom of St James in Nôtre Dame is perhaps his finest work.  Coypel was a pupil of Noël Quillerier.

Noël died in Paris at age 78, one day before his 79th birthday.  His sons Antoine and Noël-Nicolas were also painters.

Gallery

References

Further reading

External links
 Noël Coypel in the Louvre

1628 births
1707 deaths
17th-century French painters
French male painters
18th-century French painters
18th-century French male artists